Petrolina AEK Larnaca B.C. (in Greek: ΑΕΚ Λάρνακας), is a Cypriot professional basketball club based in Larnaca, Cyprus. The club competes in the Cypriot Basketball League. The president of the team is Vasilis Sellas and the current head coach is Nikolas Papadopoulos.

History
AEK Larnaca B.C. was formed in 1994 after a merger of two Larnaca clubs: EPA Larnaca and Pezoporikos. The team has many participations in the Cyprus Basketball Division A but had also relegated to the second division. Before the merger of the two teams, Pezoporikos won the championship four times (1973, 1991, 1992, 1994). As AEK the team has won the two titles of the second division. In 2013, the team achieved its first Championship as AEK, after beating APOEL in the finals by 3–1.

Season by season

Honours

League achievements
Cyprus First Division
Champions (5): 2012–13, 2014–15, 2015–16, 2017–18, 2020–21
Cyprus Second Division
Champions (2): 2004–05, 2006–07
Cyprus Cup
Winners (3): 2016-17, 2017–18, 2020-21
Cypriot Super Cup
Winners (5): 2013, 2015, 2016, 2017, 2018

European competitions
1994–1995: FIBA European Cup
1995–1996: Korać Cup
2001–2002: Korać Cup
2015–2016: FIBA Europe Cup
2016–2017: FIBA Europe Cup

Roster

Notable players

External links
 Official Website
 AEK Larnaca Fans
 Eurobasket.com AEK Larnaca BC Page
 Basketball Champions League profile

Videos
 AEK Larnaca v Telenet Giants Antwerp - Full Game Qualif. Rd. 1 - Basketball Champions League 2018-19 Full game (Youtube.com video) 

Basketball teams in Cyprus
Basketball teams established in 1994
 
1994 establishments in Cyprus